The Boys' 100 kg tournament in Judo at the 2014 Summer Youth Olympics was held on August 19 at the Longjiang Gymnasium.

This event was the heaviest of the boy's judo weight classes, limiting competitors to a maximum of 100 kilograms of body mass. The tournament bracket consisted of a single-elimination contest culminating in a gold medal match. Since there were only four attendees, it was decided that only one bronze medal will be granted instead of two bronze medals.

Results

Main Bracket

References
 Judo Contest Sheet & Fights Results
 Official Judo Results Book

B100
Judo at the Youth Olympics Boys' 100 kg